Caldwell Township is a civil township of Missaukee County in the U.S. state of Michigan. The population was 1,317 at the 2010 census.

History

It was originally named Quilna Township but was renamed to its current name in 1873.

The township was organized in 1872. It was named by the legislature after Thomas T. Caldwell and his brother John Caldwell. They both purchased large homesteads in the township from the government shortly after the American Civil War. The land was selected because of the large quantity of old growth white pine. Their timber provided lumber for construction of nearby Lake City, Manton, and Cadillac.

Thomas ran in the first county election of 1871. John married Martha Babcock in the township on June 29, 1873. They raised 3 children on their Caldwell township homestead: Florence, Leona, and Frank.

In 1904 the small town of Arlene had a general store and post office which operated there until 1906.

The Caldwell cemetery is near Arlene in Caldwell Township.

Geography

The northernmost shores of Lake Missaukee extend into Caldwell Township.

Major highways
 runs east–west through the center of the township.
 forms the entire eastern boundary of the township.

Demographics
As of the census of 2000, there were 1,363 people, 523 households, and 369 families residing in the township. There were 838 housing units at an average density of 24.3 per square mile (9.4/km2). The racial makeup of the township was 96.70% White, 0.73% Native American, 1.03% from other races, and 1.54% from two or more races. Hispanic or Latino of any race were 1.17% of the population.

There were 523 households, out of which 33.8% had children under the age of 18 living with them, 54.1% were married couples living together, 11.7% had a female householder with no husband present, and 29.4% were non-families. 23.9% of all households were made up of individuals, and 11.1% had someone living alone who was 65 years of age or older.  The average household size was 2.56 and the average family size was 3.04.

In the township the population was spread out, with 27.9% under the age of 18, 7.5% from 18 to 24, 27.7% from 25 to 44, 22.2% from 45 to 64, and 14.7% who were 65 years of age or older.  The median age was 36 years. For every 100 females, there were 96.1 males.  For every 100 females age 18 and over, there were 92.0 males.

The median income for a household in the township was $31,719, and the median income for a family was $35,214. Males had a median income of $28,558 versus $21,719 for females. The per capita income for the township was $14,674.  About 15.5% of families and 19.4% of the population were below the poverty line, including 26.0% of those under age 18 and 14.8% of those age 65 or over.
Caldwell township's population was 1,423 people as of 2007. It has had a population growth of 4.40% since 2000. The median home cost is $128,900. Caldwell township's cost of living is 19.81% lower than the U.S. average.

References 

Townships in Missaukee County, Michigan
Townships in Michigan
1872 establishments in Michigan
Populated places established in 1872